Ascension Catholic High School is a private, Roman Catholic high school in Donaldsonville, Louisiana.  It is the oldest Catholic school in the Roman Catholic Diocese of Baton Rouge

History
Ascension Catholic was established in 1845 as St. Vincent Institute by the Daughters of Charity.

Athletics
Ascension Catholic athletics competes in the LHSAA.

Championships
Football championships
(3) State Championships: 1941, 1973, 1992

Notable alumni
 James Carville - Nationally recognized political consultant and campaign adviser to President Bill Clinton

Jack P. F. Gremillion -Attorney General of Louisiana

References

External links
 School Website

Private elementary schools in Louisiana
Private middle schools in Louisiana
Catholic secondary schools in Louisiana
Schools in Ascension Parish, Louisiana
Donaldsonville, Louisiana
Educational institutions established in 1845
1845 establishments in Louisiana